Aethriamanta nymphaeae is a species of dragonfly of the family Libellulidae, commonly known as the L-spot basker. 
It inhabits lagoons ponds and swamps across northern Australia.

Identification

The L-spot basker Aethriamanta nymphaeae and Square-spot basker Aethriamanta circumsignata are very similar dragonflies and can be difficult to separate. The common name describes dark markings at the base of the hindwing of each species.
The L-spot basker usually has one dark brown fleck radiating between the fourth and fifth vein (Cu and A) and a small dark patch at right angles which occupies a few cells parallel to the abdomen. These marks form the L shape. A lighter brown surrounds the dark marks and may extend to the arculus and hindwing margin. Light brown marks may also exist at the base of the forewing. In some examples of the L-spot basker, the dark markings may be absent altogether.

Gallery

See also
 List of Odonata species of Australia

References

Libellulidae
Odonata of Australia
Insects of Australia
Endemic fauna of Australia
Taxa named by Maurits Anne Lieftinck
Insects described in 1949